Gürtel may refer to:

 Gürtel, Vienna, a ring road in Vienna, Austria
 Gürtel case, a political corruption case of Spain